Greatest Hits is a compilation album by Canadian country music artist Charlie Major. It was released by ViK. Recordings on January 8, 2007 and features tracks from Major's first three studio albums.

Track listing
All tracks written by Charlie Major except where noted.
 "I'm Gonna Drive You Out of My Mind" (Major, Barry Brown) - 4:07
 "I'm Somebody" (Major, Brown) - 3:34
 "It Can't Happen to Me" - 3:58
 "The Other Side" - 3:07
 "Nobody Gets Too Much Love" - 3:24
 "Waiting on You" - 4:00
 "(I Do It) For the Money" - 3:23
 "This Crazy Heart of Mine" - 4:04
 "It's Lonely I Can't Stand" (Major, Brown) - 3:59
 "Tell Me Something I Don't Know" (Major, Brown) - 4:06
 "Someday I'm Gonna Ride in a Cadillac" - 3:40
 "I'm Feeling Kind of Lucky Tonight" - 3:42
 "Some Days Are Better" - 4:09
 "You Can Trust in My Love" - 3:33

Charlie Major albums
2007 greatest hits albums